The following is a chronicle of events during the year 1994 in ice hockey.

Olympics
In Ice hockey at the 1994 Winter Olympics, Sweden defeated Canada in a shootout as Peter Forsberg scored the gold-medal clinching goal. Finland won the bronze medal, defeating Russia by a 4–0 mark. Slovakia's Žigmund Pálffy finished as the scoring champion.

National Hockey League
Art Ross Trophy as the NHL's leading scorer during the regular season: Wayne Gretzky, Los Angeles Kings
Hart Memorial Trophy: for the NHL's Most Valuable Player: Sergei Fedorov, Detroit Red Wings
Stanley Cup - New York Rangers defeat the Vancouver Canucks in the 1994 Stanley Cup Finals
 The Florida Panthers selected Ed Jovanovski with the first pick overall in the 1994 NHL Draft

Canadian Hockey League
Ontario Hockey League: The North Bay Centennials defeated the Detroit Junior Red Wings and captured the J. Ross Robertson Cup.
Quebec Major Junior Hockey League: The Chicoutimi Saguenéens won the President's Cup (QMJHL)  for the second time in franchise history.
Western Hockey League: The Kamloops Blazers won the President's Cup (WHL) for the fifth time
Memorial Cup: The Laval Titan served as host team for the 1994 Memorial Cup, which was won by the Kamloops Blazers

International hockey
Canada beat Finland in a shootout to capture gold at the 1994 Men's Ice Hockey World Championships, winning their first gold since 1961. Sweden's Mats Sundin won the scoring championship. Games in the Championship Group A tournament were held from 25 April to 8 May 1994, played in Bolzano, Canazei and Milan.

European hockey

Women's hockey
Canada defeated the United States to capture the gold medal at the 1994 IIHF Women's World Championship.

Minor League hockey
American Hockey League: The Portland Pirates defeated the Moncton Hawks to win their first Calder Cup in franchise history. Goaltender Olaf Kolzig won the Jack A. Butterfield Trophy
International Hockey League: The Atlanta Knights defeated the Fort Wayne Komets for their only Turner Cup win in franchise history.

Junior A hockey

Season articles

Deaths
James Bedard: February 2 
Bill Mosienko: July 9
Aud Tuten: January 14

See also
1994 in sports

References